Charles Jeanne (15 May 1800 – 11 July 1837) was one of the leaders of the Parisian June Rebellion in 1832. He died of tuberculosis in 1837.

His memoir À Cinq Heures Nous Serons Tous Morts (At Five O'Clock We Will All Be Dead) helped to inspire Victor Hugo and the barricade scenes in Les Misérables.

Early life
Charles Jeanne was born on May 15, 1800 in Paris, France. His father was a store clerk and he helped with his father's business. He attended school in Caen, but had to stop at age 14 due to financial and family issues.
He was involved for a year in the French army and worked as a clerk.

1830 Rebellion

Charles Jeanne participated in the Trois Glorieuses, and was injured in action. Louis Phillippe gave him a medal for bravery.

References

1800 births
1837 deaths
French memoirists
19th-century deaths from tuberculosis
19th-century French writers
French revolutionaries
Writers from Paris
French republicans
19th-century memoirists
Tuberculosis deaths in France